Nebraska Highway 8 (N-8) is a highway in southern and southeastern Nebraska.  Its western terminus is at Nebraska Highway 14 in Superior and its eastern terminus is at U.S. Highway 73 (US 73) in Falls City.  It runs through the southern tier of counties in Nebraska and is always within  of the Kansas border.

Route description

N-8 begins at N-14 in Superior and goes east through farmland until it meets US 81 in Chester. When the highway reaches Hubbell, it begins a segment where it goes northeasterly towards Fairbury until it meets N-15. It goes north with N-15 into Fairbury, crosses the Little Blue River, then turns southeast towards Steele City. It goes straight east through Odell and Barneston, passing US 77 between those two villages. It then turns east towards Pawnee City. At Pawnee City, it meets N-50 and goes east and then south with it, separating just before Du Bois. It turns east, meets US 75 south of Dawson and ends in downtown Falls City at an intersection with US 73.

History
According to 1937 and 1940 state maps, the first N-8 designation began in Omaha on Military Road (which was rerouted at least once in the Omaha area, according to the 1955 state map).  It then passed through Irvington and Elk City before terminating in Fremont.  The original route designation largely disappeared from state maps by 1962.  Most of the original route has since been turned over to local control.

Route 3S was renumbered N-8 in about 1960.

Major intersections

See also

References

External links

 The Nebraska Highways Page: Highways 1 to 30
 Nebraska Roads: NE 1-10

008
Transportation in Nuckolls County, Nebraska
Transportation in Thayer County, Nebraska
Transportation in Jefferson County, Nebraska
Transportation in Gage County, Nebraska
Transportation in Pawnee County, Nebraska
Transportation in Richardson County, Nebraska